Philip Spratt (26 September 1902 – 8 March 1971) was a British writer and intellectual. Initially a communist sent by the British arm of the Communist International (Comintern), based in Moscow, to spread Communism in India, he subsequently became a friend and colleague of M.N. Roy, founder of the Communist parties in Mexico and India, and along with him became a communist activist.

He was among the first architects, and a founding-member of the Communist Party of India, and was among the chief accused in the Meerut Conspiracy Case; he was arrested on 20 March 1929 and imprisoned.

As a result of his reading during his time in jail, and also his observation of political developments in Russia and Western Europe at the time, Philip Spratt renounced Communism in the early 1930s. After India gained independence from the British, he was among the lone voices – such as Sita Ram Goel – against the well-intentioned and fashionable leftist policies of Nehru and the Indian government.

He was the Editor of MysIndia, a pro-American weekly, and later of Swarajya, a newspaper run by C. Rajagopalachari. He was also a prolific writer of books, articles and pamphlets on a variety of subjects, and translated books in French, German, Tamil, Sanskrit and Hindi, into English.

Early life
Philip Spratt was born in Camberwell on 26 September 1902 to Herbert Spratt, a schoolmaster, and Norah Spratt. He was one of five boys. His elder brother David Spratt, left boarding school to join the British army during World War I, and was killed at Passchendaele in 1917. Although raised a Baptist, Herbert Spratt later joined the Church of England. Philip Spratt's own rejection of religion came early on:

University and early Communist activity

Philip Spratt won a university scholarship in 1921 to study mathematics at Downing College, Cambridge. He wrote in his memoirs: "But I was in no mood to devote myself to my proper studies, or to associate with the dull dogs who stuck to theirs. I dabbled in literature and philosophy and psychology and anthropology." He was awarded a First-class degree on completing the Mathematics tripos. He joined the Union Society, the University Labour Club and a private discussion society called the Heretics, of which Charles Kay Ogden was president; Frank P. Ramsey, I.A. Richards and Patrick Blackett often attended. Philip Spratt, Maurice Dobb, John Desmond Bernal, Ivor Montagu, the historian Allen Hutt, A. L. Morton, A. L. Bacharach, Barnet Woolf and Michael Roberts comprised the tiny handful of Communist Party members at the university at that time. Spratt, Woolf and Roberts would sell the Worker's Weekly to railwaymen at the town railway station or canvass the working-class areas of Cambridge. Spratt worked, for a while, at the Labour Research Department in the Metropolitan Borough of Deptford, and was a member of the London University Labour Party.

In 1926, at the age of 24, he was asked by Clemens Dutt (the elder brother of Rajani Palme Dutt) to journey to India as a Comintern agent to organise the working of the then nascent Communist Party of India, and in particular to launch a Workers and Peasants' Party as a legal cover for their activities. He was expected to arrange for the infiltration of CPI members into the Congress party, trade unions and youth leagues to obtain leadership of them. Spratt was also asked to write a pamphlet on China, urging India to follow the example of the Kuomintang. He was accompanied to India by Ben Bradley and Lester Hutchinson.

Move to India

Spratt was arrested in 1927, on account of some cryptic letters written to and by him that were seized by the Police. He was, however, charged with sedition, on account of the pamphlet entitled India and China that he had written on Clemens Dutt's instructions. He was tried by jury and – the judge, Mr. Justice Fawcett, having summed up very leniently – they found in his favour.

Hansard records show that on 28 November 1927, Shapurji Saklatvala, the MP for Battersea North, questions Earl Winterton (then Under-Secretary of State for India in Baldwin's government) about the wrongful detention of Philip Spratt for six weeks prior to his trial.

HC Deb 28 November 1927 vol 211 cc15-6

§ 32. Mr. SAKLATVALA asked the Under-Secretary of State for India if, in view of the fact that a Mr. Philip Spratt has recently been found not guilty by a jury in India of a charge of sedition in relation to the publication of a pamphlet entitled India and China, he will cause inquiries to be made as to the reason why he was in the first instance refused bail and thus kept in prison for six weeks prior to trial; and whether he will make representations for compensation to be paid to the said British national?

§ Earl WINTERTON It appears from the newspapers that bail was refused by Mr. Justice Davar in the High Court of Bombay, and it would not be proper to make inquiries as to the reasons for a decision which was within the competence of the Court. The answer to the second part of the question is in the negative.

§ Mr. SAKLATVALA Does the Noble Lord agree that this prosecution was launched by the Government and that the Judge of the High Court refused bail on certain representations which were made by the Government's prosecutor, which representations proved in the end to be untrue?
 
§ Earl WINTERTON The hon. Member is bringing a most serious charge against a Judge of the High Court, which I can-not accept for a moment. Judges of the High Court in India, as in this country, judge a question on its merits. Representations were doubtless made by prosecuting counsel, but the Judge is the sole interpreter as to whether they are correct, and I must respectfully decline to discuss on the Floor of the House the conduct of a Judge of the High Court.

§ Mr. SAKLATVALA Will the Noble Lord allow me to dispel his dramatic performance? Does the Noble Lord understand my question, which does not put any blame or comment or criticism on the Judge at all? My question is that the Judge, who gave a right decision upon the case presented to him by the Government prosecutor, afterwards, by his judgment, said it was a wrong presentation.

§ Earl WINTERTON I do not quite understand the hon. Member's question now. He has asked me whether I will cause inquiry to be made as to the reason why bail was refused. I have informed the hon. Member that I cannot do so because it would be committing a totally improper act, as criticising the action of the Judge. It rests solely with the Judge as to whether bail is granted or not.

§ Mr. SPEAKER Clearly, it is a matter for the Court of Justice.

WPP and Young Workers’ League

Spratt at once got involved in organizing Workers’ and Peasants’ Party (WPP) in Bombay, Calcutta and elsewhere. He later rose to their all India leaderships. Young Comrades’ and later Young Workers’ League were constituted, both by WPP and independently, as powerful mass organisations in 1927-30. Spratt played an active part and described their growth and activities. He wrote that WPP took initiative to form the Leagues, which became widespread in the country.

Philip Spratt and others in the WPP disagreed with MN Roy’s assessment that it should be a parallel organization to the Congress, as the latter was ‘practically dead’. WPP by its program and constitution
was working inside the
Congress to strengthen
the left and at the same
time as an independent
organization.

‘India-China’ booklet trial
Spratt wrote a booklet
‘Indian and China’ published by S. S. Mirajkar on behalf of WPP, which led to his trial. Revolution in China was advancing in
1927, deeply impacting
India’s freedom movement. Jawaharlal Nehru contacted the Chinese
revolutionaries including Madam Sun Yat-Sen
in Brussels during the
world founding conference of League Against
Imperialism.

Communists in Bombay issued series of articles about China in the daily National Herald. Philip Spratt wrote
series of articles as ‘An
Internationalist’, which
came out as the said book-
let in May 1927.
Shapurji Saklatvala wrote its introduction. It proved so
effective that the British
rulers banned it. House
of Mirajkar, WPP offices
and even newspaper of-
fices all over the country
were searched. Spratt’s
residence in the YMCA
Hostel in Bombay was
searched on September 6,
1927 and the manuscript
seized. Spratt and
Mirajkar were arrested at
the office of the Marathi
paper ‘Kranti’ under Sec-
tion 124-A. Spratt was
interned in the Arthur Road Prison for more
than 2 months. The prosecution could not prevent Spratt from a trial by
jury, who declared him
‘not-guilty’. High Court
Judge Justice Fawcett
had to acquit Spratt.
Talyarkhan was the de-
fence counsel for Spratt.
M. A. Jinnah advised
Sarojini Naidu to apply
for transfer of the case to
High Court and Spratt to
give up demand for Eu-
ropean Jury, to be
replaced by an Indian
jury, which was what
happened. Bombay
comrades used to address Sarojini Naidu as
‘mother’! That was the
bond of the Communists
with the freedom movement.
Spratt had been arrested in 1927 for some
secret letters but was
charged with sedition
for this booklet.
On November 28, 1927
Shapurji Saklatvala, Brit-
ish Communist MP for
Battersea North, ques-
tioned Earl Winterton,
Under-secretary of State
for India, about the
wrongful detention of
Spratt for weeks prior to
his trial, even though not
found guilty by the jury,
and refused bail.
Winterton replied that
the bail was refused by
Justice Devar of Bombay
High Court, and as such
it was ‘not proper’ to in-
terfere with the
competence of the Court.
He refused to reply to
any further questions.

After Spratt’s acquit-
tal, the government of
Bombay was not sure
‘whether the prosecution
was good in law’!

The British official
annual publication ‘India
in 1927-28’ noted that
Philip Spratt was exercis-
ing a strong influence.

AITUC sessions

Spratt was an active
participant in and organizer of the AITUC and
workers’ unions. The 7th
session of AITUC was
held on March 12-13, 1927
in Hindu College, Delhi.
It was attended by promi-
nent leaders like V. V. Giri,
S. V. Ghate, Lala Lajpat Rai, S. S. Mirajkar, Nimbkar,
Spratt and others. Spratt
gave detailed account of
it and played an active
role.

The 8th session of
AITUC, held in Kanpur
in November 1928, included S. A. Dange, VV Giri, N. M. Joshi and
Philip Spratt, as also
some others. Jones,
Purcell and Hallsworth
attended on behalf of the
British TUC. Rs 1000 was
allotted for the defence of
Spratt in the ‘India-China’
booklet case. The session
adopted 32 resolutions including one on theprosecution of Spratt.
Leftwing had become
very strong by this time,
and in fact SA Dange presented a separate report
on the functioning of the
left group in AITUC.

The session elected a
Council of Action of
which Spratt was a member.

A comprehensive re-
view of Indian TU
movement written by
Spratt was published in
Labour Monthly of October 1927, giving details
of organization, structure, membership union-wise and industry-wise, and movements industry-wise and section-wise.

Mirajkar, K.N. Joglekar,
Mayekar, Spratt and oth-
ers conducted
processions and strikes
of Apollo, Manchester
and other mills in
Bombay. There were ef-
forts to merge together
Girni Kamgar
Mahamandal and
Bombay Textile Labor
Union, which later resulted in GKU in 1928.

Spratt was included,
along with Dange, NM
Joshi, Diwan Chaman Lall
and others in the Sub-
committee formed to
draft a labour Constitu-
tion of India, to be
submitted to the Execu-
tive Council of India and
to labor movement. It led
to a widespread discus-
sion. He wrote detailed
proposals and articles on
it.

Spratt participated in the struggles of jute and other workers in Calcutta, Bombay and elsewhere during this time.

Slogan of Constituent Assembly

Spratt attended the
Madras session of Congress in 1927. A ‘Manifesto of WPP’ was
presented to the session,
which was prepared by
Muzaffar Ahmed in consultation with Philip
Spratt. It was published
next year, in 1928, and
formally adopted at
WPP conference in
Calcutta, in December
1928. Spratt was included in its CEC.
Significantly, it gave a
call for constituting and
holding elections to a
Constituent Assembly
based on adult franchise.

The front page of the
Manifesto for Madras
session (1927) included
slogans of ‘A National
Constituent Assembly,
Universal Adult Fran-
chise and Complete
Independence’.

Slogan of constituent
assembly, as far as is
known, was given first by
S. Srinivasa Iyengar, the
Congress president in
1927, based on a limited
franchise. MN Roy also
had proposed it in his
journal in 1928 abroad,
but it was utterly sectar-
ian as he called upon
revolutionary national-
ists not to be misled by
“the apparent victory
at Madras” gained by
passing the resolution of
full independence by
Congress.

Spratt was, in 1928, responsible for two sweepers’ strikes in Calcutta.

Meerut conspiracy trial

In March 1929, almost all the members of the Communist Party of India and about an equal number of trade unionists, congressmen and others who were working alongside them – 30 people in all – were arrested simultaneously in half a dozen different towns and taken to Meerut jail. Meerut Conspiracy Case

They were charged under Section 121A: conspiring to deprive the King Emperor of his sovereignty of British India. The body of conspirators was the Comintern and its associated organisations, and in particular the Indian party.

Spratt was sentenced to 12 years imprisonment, which on appeal, was reduced to 2; he was released from jail in October 1934. He discusses the psychology of imprisonment in an article which appeared in the Modern Review (Calcutta) in 1937.

It is his time in Meerut – Spratt records in his memoirs – that marked the beginning of his emotional turn away from communism: "When we had been in jail a year or two, the significance of the new Comintern line which we had accepted so uncomprehendingly at Calcutta began to show itself. It compelled the renovated party to split the central trade union body twice within two years, and to direct fierce criticism at the Congress, whose great Civil Disobedience campaigns made our activities look rather silly. We found fault with what was being done, but we did not direct our attack at the persons really responsible, viz. the Comintern authorities in Moscow… My own feelings were not of doubt or criticism but of boredom. I was closely involved in the preparation of the defence case, an immense and tedious job, and in the politics of the jail and the party outside. I gradually lost interest in all three, and became absorbed in reading and writing on other subjects… I have no doubt that here was the beginning of an emotional turn away from communism".

In December 1934 he was arrested again and interned under the emergency legislation passed to suppress Civil Disobedience. He spent 18 months in the Fort at Belgaum, and was released finally in June 1936.

During his time in Meerut, Spratt learnt to read Hindi and one of the first books he read was Atmakatha by Mahatma Gandhi. On doing so, he resolved to write a study of Gandhi and while in Belgaum wrote his book on the Mahatma entitled Gandhism: An Analysis. While in confinement, Spratt also wrote the foreword for Peshawar to Moscow: Leaves from an Indian Muhajireen's Diary by Shaukat Usmani.

Debate in House of Commons
The Meerut Conspiracy Case was debated in the House of Commons of the British Parliament on several occasions. The position of Philip Spratt was discussed on March 7, 1935. Sir Patrick Donner asked the Secretary of State for India whether he was aware of the fact that Spratt was interned in Belgaum Fort under the Emergency Powers Act and whether he would be deported. Butler replied that Spratt was interned under Section 4 of the EPA within the confines of the Fort, and he had been provided a suitable house. Spratt had firmly declined the offer of leaving India. H Williams asked: “If I take part in a conspiracy, will a house be provided for me after I have served my sentence?”! Spratt was released in October, 1934 from Naini Jail. From there he went to Calcutta and stayed with various leaders including CPI leader Abdul Halim. He attended several meetings of Communists, who were then split into many groups. At the beginning of October 1934, he went to Jhansi, addressing railway workers, along with Joglekar and Ayodhya Prasad. Copies of his speech on independence were circulated at the Bombay Congress, 1934. He reached Bombay on October 8, 1934, accompanied by Joglekar, and was taken in a procession to the office of Young Workers’ League. He attended the open session of the All India Congress Socialist Conference in Bombay in 1934 on October 21. He then attended a meeting of the Press Workers’ Union on October 28, and a joint meeting of various trade unions on October 31. He also issued ‘An Appeal to all Anti-imperialists’.
Spratt left for Wardha on November 14, meeting Gandhiji and talking to him for three days. He arrived in Madras on November 18, and met Young Workers’ League and CPI members. Spratt was arrested again in December 1934 under stringent emergency legislation passed to deal with civil disobedience struggle. He was again interned in the Fort in Belgaum. He was released on June 6, 1936. In Madras he had come in contact, in 1934, with the famous ‘first Communist of South India’, M. Singaravelu. The same year, he got acquainted with Seetha, the grand-niece of M. Singaravelu. Philip and Seetha married in 1939, and had four children: Herbert Mohan Spratt, Arjun Spratt, Radha Norah Spratt and Robert Spratt. The secret correspondence among the British officials mentioned Spratt as “the most dangerous enemy of government of India in India.”

Personal life

Soon after his release in 1934, he became engaged to Seetha, the grand-niece of Malayapuram Singaravelu Chettiar, who was a barrister and a founding member of the Communist Party in the south of India.  Philip and Seetha married in 1939, and had four children: Herbert Mohan Spratt, Arjun Spratt, Radha Norah Spratt and Robert Spratt.

Post-Meerut life in India

Spratt began to write strongly in criticism of Soviet policy after the Russian invasion of Finland in 1939. In 1943, he joined M. N. Roy's Radical Democratic Party, and remained a fairly active member until the party ceased to exist in 1948. In 1951, Spratt became secretary of the newly formed Indian Congress for Cultural Freedom, and a frequent contributor to its bulletin, Freedom First. He settled in Bangalore, and was the Chief Editor of a pro-American and pro-Capitalist weekly named MysIndia, until 1964. In its columns, he criticised the policies of the government which he believed, 'treated the entrepreneur as a criminal who has dared to use his brains independently of the state to create wealth and give employment'. He further believed that the result would be 'the smothering of free enterprise, a famine of consumer goods, and the tying down of millions of workers to soul deadening techniques'.

Spratt believed that the Kashmir valley should be granted independence. In 1952, he stated that India must abandon its claim to the valley and allow the National Conference leader Sheikh Abdullah to 'dream of independence'. It should withdraw its armies and write off its loans to the state government. He stated:
 He argued that Indian policy was based on a 'mistaken belief in the one-nation theory and greed to own the beautiful and strategic valley of Srinagar'. He further stated that the costs of this policy, present and future, were incalculable, and that rather than give Kashmir special privileges and create resentment elsewhere in India, it was best to let the state secede.

Spratt later moved to Madras, and edited the Swarajya, which was a newspaper run by C. Rajagopalachari, and a mouthpiece of the Swatantra Party. During these years he also wrote several books on diverse subjects, numerous pamphlets and also translated books from French, German, Tamil, Sanskrit and Hindi, into English. He died of cancer on 8 March 1971, in Madras.

He wrote an autobiographical account, ‘Blowing up India’ in 1955.

Philip Spratt died of cancer on March 8, 1971 in Madras after an eventful life full of ups and downs.

Citations

References

Further reading
 Foreword by Philip Spratt New Orientation: Lectures Delivered at the Political Study Camp Held at Dehra Dun from 8 to 18 May 1946.Calcutta, Renaissance Publishers. 1946.

External links

 IN SEARCH OF A CULPRIT

1902 births
1971 deaths
Alumni of Downing College, Cambridge
Anglo-Indian people
British communists
Indian communists
Indian atheists
British editors
Indian editors
People with acquired Indian citizenship
British emigrants to India
People from Camberwell
Prisoners and detainees of British India